Ittihad Baladiat Khemis El Khachna, known as IB Khémis El Khechna or simply IBKEK for short, IB Khémis El Khechna is an Algerian football club located in Khemis El Khechna, Algeria. The club was founded in 1932 and its colours are black and white. Their home stadium, Abdelkader Zerrouki Stadium, has a capacity of 8,000 spectators. The club is currently playing the Algerian Ligue 2.

On May 28, 2022, IB Khémis El Khechna promoted to the Algerian Ligue 2.

References

Football clubs in Algeria
Sports clubs in Algeria
1932 establishments in Algeria